Garfield, Ohio may refer to:

 Garfield, Jackson County, Ohio
 Garfield, Mahoning County, Ohio